The 22nd Punjabis was an infantry regiment of the British Indian Army. It was raised in 1857, as the 11th Regiment of Punjab Infantry. It was designated as the 22nd Punjabis in 1903 and became 3rd Battalion 14th Punjab Regiment in 1922. In 1947, it was allocated to the Pakistan Army, where it continues to exist as 7th Battalion The Punjab Regiment.

Early history
The regiment was raised at Multan on 1 August 1857, during the upheaval of the Indian Mutiny, as the 11th Regiment of Punjab Infantry from the men of the 1st Sikh Infantry and the 3rd Punjab Police Battalion. The regiment took part in the Second Opium War in 1860, the Lushai Expedition of 1871 and the Second Afghan War of 1878-80.

22nd Punjabis
Subsequent to the reforms brought about in the Indian Army by Lord Kitchener in 1903, the regiment's designation was changed to 22nd Punjabis. During the First World War, the regiment served in Mesopotamia Campaign. It fought in a number of actions including the Battle of Ctesiphon in 1915, where it suffered 396 casualties out of a strength of 814. In 1917, the 22nd Punjabis raised a 2nd battalion, which was disbanded after the war. In 1919, the regiment fought in the Third Afghan War.

Subsequent history
In 1921-22, a major reorganization was undertaken in the British Indian Army leading to the formation of large infantry groups of four to six battalions. Among these was the 14th Punjab Regiment, formed by grouping the 22nd Punjabis  with the 19th, 20th, 21st and 24th Punjabis, and the 40th Pathans. The battalion's new designation was 3rd Battalion 14th Punjab Regiment. During the Second World War, the battalion fought in Eritrea, North Africa and Burma. In 1947, the 14th Punjab Regiment was allocated to Pakistan Army. In 1956, it was merged with the 1st, 15th and 16th Punjab Regiments to form one large Punjab Regiment, and 3/14th Punjab was redesignated as 7 Punjab. During the 1965 Indo-Pakistan War, the battalion fought in Kasur Sector, while in 1971, it fought at Suleimanki.

Genealogy

1857 11th Regiment of Punjab Infantry
1861 26th Regiment of Bengal Native Infantry
1861 22nd Regiment of Bengal Native Infantry
1864 22nd (Punjab) Regiment of Bengal Native Infantry
1885 22nd (Punjab) Regiment of Bengal Infantry
1901 22nd Punjab Infantry
1903 22nd Punjabis
1917 1st Battalion 22nd Punjabis
1922 3rd Battalion 14th Punjab Regiment
1956 7th Battalion The Punjab Regiment

References

Further reading
Haig, Brodie. Fourteenth Punjab Regiment 1939-1945. London: Lund Humphries, n.d.
Rizvi, Brig SHA. (1984). Veteran Campaigners – A History of the Punjab Regiment 1759-1981. Lahore: Wajidalis.
Cardew, Lt FG. (1903). A Sketch of the Services of the Bengal Native Army to the Year 1895. Calcutta: Military Department.

See also
14th Punjab Regiment
Punjab Regiment

British Indian Army infantry regiments
Punjab Regiment (Pakistan)
Military units and formations established in 1857
1857 establishments in India